Jordan David Verdone (born April 7, 1989, in Echo Bay, Ontario) is a professional Canadian football linebacker who played forfour seasons in the Canadian Football League (CFL), most recently for the Ottawa Redblacks. He was drafted in the fifth round, 37th overall by the BC Lions in the 2012 CFL Draft and after returning to school that year, he signed with the Montreal Alouettes for the 2013 season and made their opening day roster. He played CIS football for the Calgary Dinos in 2011 and 2012 following a two-year stint with the Waterloo Warriors.

Professional career
Verdone was drafted in the fifth round, 37th overall by the BC Lions in the 2012 CFL Draft and signed with the team on May 28, 2012. After spending time on the team's practice roster, he was released on July 3, 2012 and rejoined the Calgary Dinos. During the following off-season, he signed with the Hamilton Tiger-Cats on April 4, 2013, only to be released on April 24, 2013 following the team's spring workout. Soon after, Verdone signed with the Montreal Alouettes on May 25, 2013 and secured a spot on the opening day roster following training camp. He played in his first CFL game on Jun 27, 2013 against the Winnipeg Blue Bombers. On December 16, 2013, Verdone was drafted by the Ottawa Redblacks in the 2013 CFL Expansion Draft. He played with the team for two years before becoming a free agent in 2016.

References

External links
Ottawa Redblacks bio 

1989 births
Living people
Players of Canadian football from Ontario
Canadian football linebackers
Calgary Dinos football players
Montreal Alouettes players
Ottawa Redblacks players
People from Algoma District